Andrzej Adam Wroński (born 8 October 1965 in Kartuzy, Pomorskie) is a Polish wrestler (Greco-Roman style) who has won two Olympic gold medals. He carried the flag at the opening ceremony of the 2000 Summer Olympics in Sydney, Australia.

Mixed martial arts record

|-
| Loss
| align=center | 0–1
|  Paweł Nastula
| TKO (punches)
| Wieczór Mistrzów
| 
| align=center | 1
| align=center | 1:09
| Koszalin, Poland
|

For his sport achievements, he received the Order of Polonia Restituta: 
 Knight's Cross (5th Class) in 1988, 
 Officer's Cross (4th Class) in 1995, 
 Commander's Cross (3rd Class) in 1996.

References

External links
 

1965 births
Living people
People from Kartuzy
Olympic gold medalists for Poland
Olympic wrestlers of Poland
Wrestlers at the 1988 Summer Olympics
Wrestlers at the 1992 Summer Olympics
Wrestlers at the 1996 Summer Olympics
Wrestlers at the 2000 Summer Olympics
Polish male sport wrestlers
Kashubians
Olympic medalists in wrestling
Polish male mixed martial artists
Heavyweight mixed martial artists
Mixed martial artists utilizing Greco-Roman wrestling
Sportspeople from Pomeranian Voivodeship
Medalists at the 1996 Summer Olympics
Medalists at the 1988 Summer Olympics
European Wrestling Championships medalists
World Wrestling Championships medalists
20th-century Polish people
21st-century Polish people